MV Puyallup is a  operated by Washington State Ferries. This ferry and her two sisters are the largest in the fleet. Puyallup is normally assigned to the Edmonds–Kingston route, although she is often reassigned to the Seattle–Bainbridge Island route whenever either of her sisters assigned to that route are out of service.

In mid-2008, Puyallup was sent out of service for repainting and to have a new security system installed. She returned to service in January 2009.
In the winter of 2013 she was hauled and her hull was stripped down to steel for a thorough inspection and scheduled maintenance. She was also fitted with new five-bladed propellers as an experiment to reduce vibration and increase efficiency.

Incidents
There have been a few incidents in which passengers aboard Puyallup have disappeared. On April 15, 2001, a man disappeared while en route from Seattle to Bainbridge Island. Authorities suspected he fell overboard when the ship turned to enter Eagle Harbor while he was sitting on a railing. On January 13, 2009, a woman disappeared while the ferry was en route from Seattle to Bainbridge Island. Her husband found what he believed to be a suicide note.

References

External links 

MV Puyallup vessel info from WSDOT
MV Puyallup info from Evergreenfleet.com

Washington State Ferries vessels
1999 ships
Ships built in Seattle